Senemar or Sanamar (pronounced "Senemar" in Arabic: سنمار) was a Byzantine architect who was requested by the Lakhmid king Al-Nu'man I ibn Imru al-Qays to build the most beautiful palace of the Sasanian Empire.

After 20 years, Senemar finished building the palace, named Khawarnaq (Arabic: الخورنق), and invited the king to see it. It was a real piece of art. After a small discussion between the two, Senemar told the king two things: the first was about a brick within the palace that would cause the whole construction to collapse if moved, and that he was the only one to know where it lies; the second was that he could build a palace that moved with the sunlight wherever it went. The king, who became afraid of Senemar's knowledge of the brick and jealous he might build a bigger and more beautiful palace for another king, ordered his guardians to kill Senemar by throwing him off the palace down to the ground.

"Senemar's compensation" or "Senemar's Reward" is used proverbially in Persian and Arabic to refer to a situation where on does good work but is instead punished or given an unfair or too small reward.

References

Byzantine architects
5th-century architects
4th-century architects